Claretta (English title Claretta Petacci) is a 1984 Italian historical drama film directed and written by Pasquale Squitieri.

The film entered the competition at the 41° Venice International Film Festival. For her role of Claretta Petacci, Claudia Cardinale was awarded with a Nastro d'Argento for Best Actress.

Cast
 Claudia Cardinale - Claretta Petacci
 Giuliano Gemma - Marcello Petacci
Caterina Boratto - Giuseppina Petacci
Fernando Briamo - Benito Mussolini
Nancy Brilli - Miriam Petacci
Angela Goodwin - Luisa
María Mercader - Princess of Montenevoso
Catherine Spaak - Roberta

References

External links

1984 films
Italian drama films
1980s Italian-language films
Films directed by Pasquale Squitieri
Cultural depictions of Italian women
Cultural depictions of Benito Mussolini
1980s Italian films
1984 drama films